Maxillata is a genus of thrips in the family Phlaeothripidae.

Species
 Maxillata allani
 Maxillata priesneri
 Maxillata tremblayi

References

Phlaeothripidae
Thrips
Thrips genera